

Champions
Temple Cup: Baltimore Orioles over Cleveland Spiders (4–0)
National League: Baltimore Orioles

National League final standings

National League statistical leaders

Batting average: Jesse Burkett – .410
Home runs: Ed Delahanty and Bill Joyce – 13
Runs batted in: Ed Delahanty – 126
Wins: Frank Killen and Kid Nichols – 30
Earned run average: Billy Rhines – 2.45
Strikeouts: Cy Young – 140

Notable seasons
Philadelphia Phillies left fielder Ed Delahanty led the NL in home runs (13), slugging percentage (.631), adjusted OPS+ (190), and runs batted in (126). He was second in the NL in total bases (315). He was third in the NL in batting average (.397) and on-base percentage (.472).
Cleveland Spiders pitcher Cy Young had a win–loss record of 28–15 and led the NL in strikeouts (140) and shutouts (5). He was second in the NL in innings pitched (414.1). He was third in the NL in wins (28). He was fifth in the NL in earned run average (3.24) and adjusted ERA+ (140).

Events
April 7 – A broken wrist that refuses to heal compels Louisville first baseman Pete Cassidy to be the first MLB player to try a newfangled medical breakthrough called the "x-ray".
May 9 –
Shortstop Herman Long hits for the cycle to give the Boston Beaneaters a 17–5 victory over the Louisville Colonels.
The Washington Senators defeat the Pittsburgh Pirates, 14–9, in a beanball battle. Senators pitcher Win Mercer hits three Pittsburgh batters while Pirate Pink Hawley plunks three Washington batters in a disastrous 11-run seventh inning, tying a mark he set on July 4, . Hawley retires in 1900 after nine seasons of play with a still-standing National League record of 195 hit batters. All told, eight batters are plunked in the contest, a National League-record five by Hawley. The five Washington batters hit by pitches ties the NL mark and won't be matched until July 2, .
Hughie Jennings of the Baltimore Orioles knocks down Cincinnati Reds third baseman Charlie Irwin before he can catch Bid McPhee's throw. Jennings scores afterward to give the Orioles a controversial 6–5, 10-inning win over Cincinnati. Umpire Bob Emslie is escorted out of the ballpark by Cincinnati police.
May 30 – Washington Senators third baseman Bill Joyce hits for the cycle in an 8–1 victory over the Pittsburgh Pirates.
July 13 – Philadelphia Phillies left fielder Ed Delahanty becomes the second Major Leaguer to hit four home runs in a game, two of them being inside-the-park home runs.  It wasn't enough, as the Phillies lose to the Chicago Colts, 9–8.  He is the only member of the "four home runs in a game" club to have an inside-the-park home run as part of his feat, and he is the first player to do so in a losing effort.

Births

January
January 17 – Harry Hanson
January 18 – Bill McGowan
January 18 – Babe Twombly
January 19 – Ollie Hanson
January 22 – Frank Fahey
January 23 – Billy Mullen
January 24 – Jim Lindsey
January 25 – Ray Schmandt
January 27 – Milt Gaston
January 31 – Pinky Hargrave
January 31 – Charlie Robertson

February
February 3 – Chicken Hawks
February 4 – Andy Woehr
February 10 – Bill Whaley
February 11 – Charles Johnston
February 17 – Frank Emmer
February 20 – Muddy Ruel
February 21 – Turkey Gross
February 21 – Dick McCabe
February 22 – Ferdie Moore
February 26 – Rip Collins
February 27 – Will Koenigsmark
February 27 – Cy Perkins
February 28 – Homer Ezzell
February 29 – Ralph Miller
February 29 – Roy Parker

March
March 3 – Bert Griffith
March 5 – Bernie Hungling
March 8 – Lefty Clarke
March 9 – Rube Yarrison
March 16 – Arlas Taylor
March 22 – Chick Holmes

April
April 15 – Dutch Distel
April 18 – Rip Conway
April 20 – Harland Rowe
April 23 – Elam Vangilder
April 24 – Pug Griffin
April 24 – Ken Penner
April 25 – Fred Haney
April 25 – Marty Shay
April 27 – Rogers Hornsby
April 29 – Johnnie Heving

May
May 1 – Heine Meine
May 2 – Bill Piercy
May 3 – Bob Hasty
May 7 – Tom Zachary
May 16 – Red Ostergard
May 18 – George Edmondson
May 19 – Merito Acosta
May 19 – Bud Culloton
May 24 – Leo Mangum
May 28 – Warren Giles
May 31 – Socks Seibold

June
June 1 – Johnny Mostil
June 1 – Joel Newkirk
June 5 – Wade Lefler
June 5 – Ray Richmond
June 7 – Toussaint Allen
June 11 – Charlie Hollocher
June 18 – Newt Halliday
June 25 – Earl Howard

July
July 1 – Bert Cole
July 3 – Curt Walker
July 4 – Charles Wesley
July 5 – Buck Freeman
July 5 – Hank Thormahlen
July 7 – John Jenkins
July 8 – Roy Crumpler
July 9 – Carl Holling
July 10 – Bill Schindler
July 19 – Joe Boley
July 19 – Bob Meusel
July 20 – Ollie Fuhrman
July 20 – Mutt Wilson
July 27 – Rube Walberg
July 29 – Eugene Keeton
July 31 – Chick Sorrells

August
August 4 – Chick Galloway
August 4 – Cliff Lee
August 6 – Ray Blades
August 15 – Ben Rochefort
August 15 – Bill Sherdel
August 17 – Doug McWeeny
August 23 – Cedric Durst
August 24 – Bevo LeBourveau
August 28 – Aaron Ward
August 29 – Arthur Henderson

September
September 2 – Paul Johnson
September 2 – Harry Shriver
September 5 – Gil Gallagher
September 6 – Mack Eggleston
September 6 – Frank McCrea
September 6 – Paul Zahniser
September 8 – Val Picinich
September 8 – Johnny Schulte
September 10 – Sammy Hale
September 13 – Pat Collins
September 13 – Art Stokes
September 13 – Roy Wilson
September 21 – Herschel Bennett
September 24 – Kewpie Pennington

October
October 2 – Sid Womack
October 5 – Charlie Pechous
October 5 – Danny Silva
October 6 – Harry Heitmann
October 8 – Tim Murchison
October 13 – Claude Davidson
October 13 – Charlie See
October 14 – Oscar Charleston
October 15 – Mule Watson
October 16 – John Brock
October 19 – Bob O'Farrell
October 20 – Wid Matthews
October 22 – Sam Bohne
October 27 – Frank Okrie
October 28 – Roxy Snipes
October 30 – Clyde Manion
October 31 – Leo Dickerman

November
November 2 – Chick Maynard
November 8 – Bucky Harris
November 10 – Jimmy Dykes
November 14 – Red Sheridan
November 15 – Bert Ellison
November 16 – Ivy Griffin
November 17 – Sam Post
November 18 – Bill Hughes
November 20 – Cecil Duff
November 22 – Bill Hollahan
November 23 – Dick Reichle
November 27 – John Singleton
November 29 – Joe DeBerry

December
December 2 – Gene Bedford
December 2 – Mike Wilson
December 4 – Allen Conkwright
December 6 – Bob Larmore
December 6 – Frank Luce
December 10 – Spoke Emery
December 11 – Johnny Walker
December 13 – Denny Williams
December 14 – Charlie Hargreaves
December 17 – Jim Mattox
December 26 – Herman Pillette

Deaths
January 4 – Tom Foley, 49, outfielder.
January 22 – George Heubel, 47, outfielder for two seasons in the National Association, 1871–1872, and one in the National League, 1876.
March 16 – Kid Madden, 28, pitcher for the Boston Beaneaters, Boston Reds, and Baltimore Orioles from 1887 to 1891.
May 3 – George McVey, 30, first baseman/catcher.
June 4 – John Hauck, 66, owner of the Cincinnati Red Stockings in the mid-1880s.
July 23 – Jack Beach, 34, outfielder.
August 5 – Ben Stephens, 28, pitcher.
August 29 – Curt Welch, 34, center fielder in the American Association who led league in doubles with 1889 Athletics and scored 100 runs five times.
September 20 – Ed Crane, 34, pitcher/outfielder for nine seasons, most prominently for the New York Giants.
September 23 – John Crowley, 34, catcher for the 1884 Philadelphia Quakers.
September 26 – John Curran, 44, appeared in three games for the 1876 Philadelphia Athletics.
November 10 – Jim Ritz, 22, third baseman.
December 30 – Dave Birdsall, 58, outfielder.

References

External links
1896 National League season team stats at Baseball Reference